Moulavi Asmat Ali Khan was a Bangladeshi Advocate, Politician, Educationist and Social Worker. Asmat Ali Khan was also the first elected MP Member of the Parliament in 1973. He was a close alias of Bangladesh's Father of Nation Sheikh Mujibur Rahman. In 2016 a bridge was opened under his name. In 1953 he even started a school in his community.

Early life
Moulavi Asmat Ali Khan was born in 1907 in British India (now Bangladesh). He graduated from Law at a very early age and started social work. His son Shahjahan Khan is a government minister.

Career
Khan was elected as an M.L.A in the year 1954 during the East Bengal Elections. Later in 1970, he was the elected M.P.A. In 1973, Khan became the first elected Member of Parliament from Faridpur-14 (Vote Area Number 214), (Madaripur). He was also the founding member and president of Madaripur Awami League. In 2016 he received Swadhinata Padak.

References

1907 births
1993 deaths
People from Madaripur District
Awami League politicians
1st Jatiya Sangsad members